Flavia Damasceni Peretti (1574, Rome – 14 September 1606) was an Italian noblewoman, niece of Pope Sixtus V and duchess consort of Bracciano as wife of Virginio Orsini. She is also known as the patroness of several poets, writers and musicians.

Biography 
Flavia was born in 1574, Rome, as the daughter of Fabio Damasceni and Maria Felicita Peretti. She had a sister, Orsina, and two brothers, Alessandro and Michele. Her maternal grandmother was the sister of Cardinal Felice Peretti (future Pope Sixtus V, 1585-1590). Cardinal Peretti adopted Flavia and her siblings, gave them his name and took care of their education, having them raised by Lucrezia Salviati, natural daughter of Cardinal Bernardo Salviati and wife of Latino Orsini. Orsina married Marcantonio Colonna, Duke of Tagliacozzo; Alessandro became Cardinal and Michele became Prince of Venafro.

Flavia, described as a blonde girl of remarkable beauty, was asked in marriage by Ranuccio I Farnese, Duke of Parma; and by Charles I of Guise, Duke of Guise. However, she was given in marriage to Virginio Orsini, Duke of Bracciano. Virginio's mother, Isabella, was a member of the Medici family, Grand Dukes of Tuscany.

The two were married by proxy on 20 March 1589. The ceremony was celebrated by Fabio Biondi, Patriarch of Jerusalem, and the bride's dowry was 100,000 scudi. At least two songs were composed for the occasion: Nelle nozze degl’ill.mi sig.ri il sig. don Verginio Orsino e la signora donna Flavia Peretta of Baldo Catani and Nelle felicissime nozze de… don Verginio Orsino… & donna Flavia Peretta of Giovanni Girolamo Fiorelli. The couple had twelve children, nine of whom survived.

Flavia was passionate about music, singing and dancing, and she created a musical salon together with her brother Alessandro. In addition to performing herself, she hosted virtuosos such as Luca Marenzio, Vittoria Archilei and Francesco Rasi. Her interests also included weaving and the art of women's hairdressing.

Several compositions were dedicated to her, the work, among others, by Giovan Francesco Buoni, under the pseudonym of Academico Sfregiato; Ercole Marescotti, under the pseudonym of Hercole Filogenio; and Torquato Tasso, with the pseudonym of Uranio Felice, who dedicated her Tempio fabricato da diversi coltissimi, e nobilissimi ingegni. 

After 1590 Flavia and her husband lived in Florence, guests at Palazzo Pitti. Flavia was received at the Medici court and made friends with various ladies, including Christina of Lorraine, Margherita Aldobrandini, Virginia de' Medici and Laura d'Este. She took part in all the social events of the period, including the marriage of Maria de' Medici to the French King Henry IV.

Meanwhile, she assumed the administrative responsibilities of the Duchy of Bracciano.

Flavia died during her twelfth delivery on 14 September 1606, giving birth to a stillborn daughter.

Issue 
By her marriage, she had twelve children, eight sons and four daughters: 

 Paolo Giordano II (1591 – 24 May 1646). Duke after his father. He married Isabella Appiani, Ruler Princess of Piombino, and became a Prince of Holy Roman Empire.
 Alessandro (1592 – 22 August 1626). Cardinal.
 Isabella (1597–1623). She married Cesare II Gonzaga, Duke of Guastalla.
 Maria Felicia (12 November 1600 – 5 June 1666). She married Henri II, Duke of Montmorency.
 Camilla (29 July 1603 – ?). She married Marcantonio II Borghese, Prince of Sulmona. After widowed, she became a nun and, after her death, she was declared venerable. 
 Ferdinando (? – 4 March 1660). Duke after his brother.
 Cosimo. Military.
 Virginio. Discalced Carmelite.
 Francesco. Jesuit.
 Carlo. Died young.
 Raimondo. Died young.
 Stillborn daughter (14 September 1606). Her mother died in childbirth.

References 

1574 births
1606 deaths
16th-century Italian nobility
Nobility from Rome
16th-century Italian women
Renaissance women
Orsini family